Acacia pilligaensis, commonly known as Pillaga wattle or pinbush wattle, is a tree or shrub belonging to the genus Acacia and the subgenus Phyllodineae native to eastern Australia.

Description
It has resinous angled branchlets that are glabrous or sparsely hairy. Like most species of Acacia it has phyllodes rather than true leaves. After flowering firmly papery and glabrous seed pods form, they are more or less straight and flat except over the seeds.

Taxonomy
The species was first formally described by the botanist Joseph Maiden in 1920 as part of the work Notes on Acacias, with descriptions of new species published in the Journal and Proceedings of the Royal Society of New South Wales. It was reclassified as Racosperma pilligaense in 2003 by Leslie Pedley and transferred back to genusAcacia in 2006. It is often confused with 'Acacia burbidgeae''.
The specific epithet is derived from the Pillaga scrub locale from where the type specimen was collected.

Distribution
It is endemic to and has a disjunct distribution in north eastern New South Wales and south Queensland where it is found in Pillaga scrubland to around Gulgong and the Goonoo State Forest in the south where it is found in sandy soils as a part of dry sclerophyll forest communities.

See also
 List of Acacia species

References

pilligaensis
Flora of New South Wales
Flora of Queensland
Plants described in 1920
Taxa named by Joseph Maiden